is a passenger railway station in located in the city of Higashiōmi,  Shiga Prefecture, Japan, operated by the private railway operator Ohmi Railway.

Lines
Ichinobe Station is served by the Ohmi Railway Yōkaichi Line, and is located 3.0 rail kilometers from the terminus of the line at Yōkaichi Station.

Station layout
The station consists of two unnumbered side platforms connected to the station building by a level crossing. The station is unattended.

Platforms

Adjacent stations

History
Ichinobe Station was opened on December 29, 1913.

Passenger statistics
In fiscal 2019, the station was used by an average of 210 passengers daily (boarding passengers only).

Surroundings
 Higashiomi City Funaoka Junior High School
 Japan National Route 421

See also
List of railway stations in Japan

References

External links

 Ohmi Railway official site 

Railway stations in Japan opened in 1913
Railway stations in Shiga Prefecture
Higashiōmi